Nazim-e-Abottabad() is the Mayor who heads the District Government of Abbottabad which controls the Local Government system of Abbottabad District.

Local government system of Abbottabad 

Abbottabad local government is headed by District Government Abottabad which itself consists of District Council consisting of 77 members who elect their respective District Nazim (mayor) and Naib Nazim (Deputy Mayor).

The powers and functions of District Council are defined in KPK Local Government Act 2013.

Following are the number of seats for Abbottabad

List of mayors of Abbottabad 

6- Ali Khan Jadoon,  Sardar waqar Nabi PTI
7-Sardar Saeed Anwar.
Babu Javed PTI
18 August 2018-21Jan 2019

Abbottabad local government elections 2015 

detailed results: KPK Local Elections 2015

Following are the results of Abbottabad Local Elections 2015

PTI got a marginal lead in a PMLN stronghold in the Abbottabad local elections, but couldn't bring its mayor in Abbottabad

PTI dissident Sardar Sher Bahadur who has been ex-district president for the party was refused party ticket to contest local elections, thus competed as Independent candidate. He later secured support from PMLN and PTI forward bloc and got elected as mayor of Abbottabad. He was unseated by ECP for defection but Peshawar high court has suspended ECP's decision Moreover they have filed a case against the provincial government for demanding their budget. They have been succeeded in that case. Now that district government has been given their required budget.

See also 
 Mayor of Peshawar

External links 
 Khyber Pakhtunkhwa Local Government Act 2013

References 

Lists of mayors of places in Pakistan
Abbotabad